Graciela Saldaña Fraire (born 4 February 1961) is a Mexican politician affiliated with the PRD. As of 2013 she served as Deputy of the LXII Legislature of the Mexican Congress representing Quintana Roo.

References

1961 births
Living people
People from Mexico City
Women members of the Chamber of Deputies (Mexico)
Party of the Democratic Revolution politicians
21st-century Mexican politicians
21st-century Mexican women politicians
Deputies of the LXII Legislature of Mexico
Members of the Chamber of Deputies (Mexico) for Quintana Roo